Sir John Rankine Goody  (1919–2015) was an English social anthropologist. He was a prominent lecturer at Cambridge University, and was William Wyse Professor of Social Anthropology from 1973 to 1984.

Among his main publications were Death, property and the ancestors (1962),  Technology, Tradition, and the State in Africa (1971), The myth of the Bagre (1972) and The domestication of the savage mind (1977).

Early life and education
Born 27 July 1919, His parents were Harold Goody (1885–1969) and Lilian Rankine Goody (1885–1962). Goody grew up in Welwyn Garden City and St Albans, where he attended St Albans School. He went up to St John's College, Cambridge to study English literature in 1938, where he met leftist intellectuals like Eric Hobsbawm, Raymond Williams and E. P. Thompson.

Military service
Goody left university to fight in World War II. Following officer training, he was commissioned into the Sherwood Foresters (Nottinghamshire and Derbyshire Regiment), British Army, on 23 March 1940 as a second lieutenant. Fighting in North Africa, he was captured by the Germans and spent three years in prisoner-of-war camps. At the end of the war he held the rank of lieutenant. Following his release, he returned to Cambridge to continue his studies.

He officially relinquished his commission on 19 January 1952.

Academic career
Inspired by James George Frazer's Golden Bough and the archaeologist V. Gordon Childe, he transferred to Archaeology and Anthropology when he resumed university study in 1946. Meyer Fortes was his first mentor in Social Anthropology. After fieldwork with the LoWiili and LoDagaa peoples in northern Ghana, Goody increasingly turned to comparative study of Europe, Africa and Asia.

Between 1954 and 1984, he taught social anthropology at Cambridge University, serving as the William Wyse Professor of Social Anthropology from 1973 until 1984. He gave the Luce Lectures at Yale University—Fall 1987.

Goody has pioneered the comparative anthropology of literacy, attempting to gauge the preconditions and effects of writing as a technology. He also published about the history of the family and the anthropology of inheritance. More recently, he has written on the anthropology of flowers and food.

Later life
Goody died on 16 July 2015, aged 95. His funeral was held on 29 July at the West Chapel, Cambridge City Crematorium.

Honours
In 1976, Goody was elected Fellow of the British Academy (FBA). He was an associate of the US National Academy of Sciences. In the 2005 Queen's Birthday Honours, he was appointed a Knight Bachelor "for services to Social Anthropology", and therefore granted the use of the title sir. In 2006, he was appointed Commandeur dans l’Ordre des Arts et des Lettres by the French Republic.

Works
Jack Goody explained social structure and social change primarily in terms of three major factors. The first was the development of intensive forms of agriculture that allowed the accumulation of surplus – surplus explained many aspects of cultural practice from marriage to funerals as well as the great divide between African and Eurasian societies. Second, he explained social change in terms of urbanisation and growth of bureaucratic institutions that modified or overrode traditional forms of social organisation, such as family or tribe, identifying civilisation as "the culture of cities". And third, he attached great weight to the technologies of communication as instruments of psychological and social change. He associated the beginnings of writing with the task of managing surplus and, in a paper with Ian Watt (Goody and Watt 1963), he advanced the argument that the rise of science and philosophy in classical Greece depended on the invention of the alphabet. As these factors could be applied to any contemporary social system or to systematic changes over time, his work is equally relevant to many disciplines.

Books
 1956 The Social Organisation of the LoWiili (London, HMSO), 2nd ed. 1976, London, published for the International African Institute by the Oxford University Press
 1962 Death, Property and the Ancestors: A Study of the Mortuary Customs of the LoDagaa of West Africa, Stanford, Stanford University Press 
 1968 ed., Literacy in Traditional Societies (Cambridge, Cambridge University Press); translated into German and Spanish.
 1971 Technology, Tradition, and the State in Africa, Oxford, Oxford University Press
 1971 The Developmental Cycle in Domestic Groups, Cambridge, Cambridge University Press 
 1972 The Myth of the Bagre, Oxford, Oxford University Press 
 1973 ed., The Character of Kinship, Cambridge, Cambridge University Press
 1974 with Stanley Jeyaraja Tambiah, Bridewealth and Dowry, Cambridge, Cambridge University Press 
 1976 Production and Reproduction: A Comparative Study of the Domestic Domain, Cambridge, Cambridge University Press 
 1977 The Domestication of the Savage Mind, Cambridge, Cambridge University Press; translated into Spanish, French, Italian, Japanese, Portuguese, Turkish.
 1982 Cooking, Cuisine and Class: A Study in Comparative Sociology, Cambridge, Cambridge University Press; translated into Spanish, French and Portuguese.
 1983 The Development of the Family and Marriage in Europe, Cambridge, Cambridge University Press; translated into Spanish, French, Italian, Portuguese.
 1986 The Logic of Writing and the Organisation of Society, Cambridge, Cambridge University Press; translated into Spanish, German, French, Italian, Polish, Portuguese.
 1987 The Interface Between the Written and the Oral, Cambridge, Cambridge University Press 
 1990 The Oriental, the Ancient and the Primitive: Systems of Marriage and the Family in the Pre-Industrial Societies of Eurasia (Studies in Literacy, the Family, Culture and the State), Cambridge, Cambridge University Press 
 1993 The Culture of Flowers, Cambridge, Cambridge University Press; translated into French and Italian.
 1995 The Expansive Moment: The Rise of Social Anthropology in Britain and Africa, 1918–1970, Cambridge, Cambridge University Press
 1996 The East in the West, Cambridge, Cambridge University Press; translated into French and Italian.
 1997 Representations and Contradictions: Ambivalence Towards Images, Theatre, Fictions, Relics and Sexuality, Oxford, Blackwell Publishers; translated into Spanish and French (Paris, La Découverte).
 1998 Food and Love: A Cultural History of East and West, London, Verso 
 2000 The European Family: An Historico-Anthropological Essay (Making of Europe), Oxford, Blackwell Publishers 
 2000 The Power of the Written Tradition, Washington and London, Smithsonian Institution Press , Washington and London, Smithsonian Institution Press 
 2004 Islam in Europe, Cambridge, Polity Press 
 2004 Capitalism and Modernity: The Great Debate, Cambridge, Polity Press ; translated into French, Turkish.
 2004 Comparative Studies In Kinship, London and New York, Routledge 
 2006 The Theft of History, Cambridge, Cambridge University Press ; translated into French, Italian, Spanish, Turkish.
 2008 Family and Inheritance: Rural Society in Western Europe, 1200-1800, Cambridge, Cambridge University Press
 2010 Myth, Ritual and the Oral, Cambridge, Cambridge University Press  ; translated into French and Turkish
 2010 Renaissances: The One or the Many?, Cambridge, Cambridge University Press  ; translated into Chinese, French, Italian, Polish, Turkish
 2012 Metals, Culture and Capitalism: An Essay on the Origins of the Modern World, Cambridge, Cambridge University Press
 2018 Changing Social Structure in Ghana: Essays in the Comparative Sociology of a New State and an Old Tradition, London and New York, Routledge

Selected articles
 1956 Jack Goody A Comparative Approach to Incest and Adultery, British Journal of Sociology, Vol. 7, No. 4 (Dec. 1956), pp. 286–305  
 1957 Fields of Social Control Among the LoDagaba The Journal of the Royal Anthropological Institute of Great Britain and Ireland, Vol. 87, No. 1 (Jan. – Jun. 1957), pp. 75–104  
 GOODY, J. 1959. The Mother's Brother and the Sister's Son in West Africa. Journal of the Royal Anthropological Institute 89:61–88 response
 1961 Jack Goody Religion and Ritual: The Definitional Problem The British Journal of Sociology, Vol. 12, No. 2 (Jun. 1961), pp. 142–164  
 1963 Jack Goody, Ian Watt The Consequences of Literacy Comparative Studies in Society and History, Vol. 5, No. 3 (Apr. 1963), pp. 304–345 
 1969 Adoption in Cross-Cultural Perspective Comparative Studies in Society and History, Vol. 11, No. 1 (Jan. 1969), pp. 55–78 
 1972 Taboo Words Man, New Series, Vol. 7, No. 1 (Mar. 1972), p. 137  
 1973 Goody, J. [Polygyny, economy and the role of women]. In J. Goody (Ed.), The character of kinship. Cambridge: Cambridge University Press, 1973
 1973 Inheritance, Property, and Marriage in Africa and Eurasia Sociology, Vol. 3, No. 1, 55–76 (1969) 
 Goody, Jack (1973) Bridewealth and Dowry in Africa and Eurasia in Bridewealth and Dowry, ed. J. Goody and S. Tambiah. Cambridge: Cambridge University Press
 Jack Goody, Joan Buckley Cross-Sex Patterns of Kin Behavior: A Comment Cross-Cultural Research, Vol. 9, No. 3, 185–202 (1974) 
 1977 Ethnology and/or Cultural Anthropology in Italy: Traditions and Developments [and Comments and Reply Vinigi Grottanelli, Giorgio Ausenda, Bernardo Bernardi, Ugo Bianchi, Y. Michal Bodemann, Jack Goody, Allison Jablonko, David I. Kertzer, Vittorio Lanternari, Antonio Marazzi, Roy A. Miller Jr., Laura Laurencich Minelli, David M. Moss, Leonard W. Moss, H. R. H. Prince Peter of Greece and Denmark, Diana Pinto, Pietro Scotti, Tullio Tentori. Current Anthropology, Vol. 18, No. 4 (Dec. 1977), pp. 593–614 
 1989 Futures of the Family in Rural Africa Population and Development Review, Vol. 15, Supplement: Rural Development and Population: Institutions and Policy (1989), pp. 119–144  
 1991 Towards a Room with a View: A Personal Account of Contributions to Local Knowledge, Theory, and Research in Fieldwork and Comparative Studies Annual Review of Anthropology, Vol. 20, 1991, pp. 1–23 
 1992 Culture and its boundaries: a European view Social Anthropology 1 (1a),9–32. 
 1994 Jack Goody, Cesare Poppi Flowers and Bones: Approaches to the Dead in Anglo-American and Italian Cemeteries Comparative Studies in Society and History, Vol. 36, No. 1 (Jan. 1994), pp. 146–175 
 1996 Comparing Family Systems in Europe and Asia: Are There Different Sets of Rules? Population and Development Review: 22 (1).
 1996 Cognitive contradictions and universals: creation and evolution in oral cultures Social Anthropology Volume 4 Issue 1 Page 1-16, February 1996. 
 2002 The Anthropology of the Senses and Sensations La Ricerca Folklorica, No. 45, Antropologia delle sensazioni (Apr. 2002), pp. 17–28  
 2004 The folktale and cultural history Cahiers de littérature orale n. 56, pp. 53–66
 2006 From misery to luxury Social Science Information, Vol. 45, No. 3, 341–348 
 2006 Gordon Childe, the Urban Revolution, and the Haute Cuisine: An Anthropo-archaeological View of Modern History Comparative Studies in Society and History (2006), 48: 503–519 (Issue 03 – May 2006) Cambridge University Press 

Notes

External links

 
 Other articles:
 
 
 
 
 
 
 
 
 
 
 
 
 
 
 
 
 
 https://web.archive.org/web/20080911060913/http://www.feem.it/NR/rdonlyres/7A086958-19BD-4AE4-861E-21A9A4D010BE/1006/11205.pdf
 
 
 
 Maria Lúcia Pallares-Burke, interview with Jack Goody. Chapter 1 of The New History: Confessions and Conversations (Polity Press, 2002). 
 Maurice Bloch, Dan Sperber (to Jack Goody)Kinship and evolved psychological dispositions: The Mother's Brother controversy reconsidered'' Current Anthropology. 2002. 43 (4) 723–748
 Interview of Jack Goody by Eric Hobsbawm 18 May 1991 (film)
 Jack Goody at "Pioneers of Qualitative Research" from the Economic and Social Data Service

1919 births
2015 deaths
English anthropologists
Literacy and society theorists
Mass media theorists
Alumni of St John's College, Cambridge
Fellows of St John's College, Cambridge
Fellows of the British Academy
Foreign associates of the National Academy of Sciences
Knights Bachelor
People from St Albans
People from Welwyn Garden City
World War II prisoners of war held by Germany
People educated at St Albans School, Hertfordshire
Commandeurs of the Ordre des Arts et des Lettres
Sherwood Foresters officers
William Wyse Professors of Social Anthropology
Military personnel from London
British World War II prisoners of war
British Army personnel of World War II
People from Hammersmith